Bruce McDonald Wight (16 June 1914 – 2 February 1969) was an Australian politician. Born in Mudgee, New South Wales, he was educated at Sydney Boys High School, graduating in 1929 before becoming a business manager in Brisbane, having moved to Queensland. He served in the military 1937–1946. In 1949, he was elected to the Australian House of Representatives as the Liberal member for Lilley, defeating Labor member Jim Hadley. He held the seat until 1961, when he was defeated by Labor's Don Cameron. He became a business executive after leaving politics. Wight died in 1969.

References

Liberal Party of Australia members of the Parliament of Australia
Members of the Australian House of Representatives for Lilley
Members of the Australian House of Representatives
20th-century Australian politicians

1914 births

1969 deaths